Michaëlla Krajicek was the defending champion, but chose not participate. She played in the Porsche Tennis Grand Prix instead, which was held in the same week at Stuttgart, Germany.
Sun Tiantian won the title, defeating Iroda Tulyaganova in the final, 6–2, 6–4.

Seeds

Draw

Finals

Top half

Bottom half

References
Main and Qualifying draw at ITF
Main and Qualifyind draws (WTA)
Tashkent Results 2006 - Tennis Quickfound

2006 WTA Tour
2006 Tashkent Open